Abu Talib ibn Abd al-Muttalib was the leader of Banu Hashim, a clan of the Qurayshi tribe of Mecca in the Hejazi region of the Arabian Peninsula. He was an uncle of the Islamic prophet Muhammad, and father of Ali. After the death of his father Abd al-Muttalib ibn Hashim ibn Abd Manaf, he inherited this position, and the offices of Siqaya and Rifada. He was well-respected in Mecca.

Early life
Abu Talib was born in the city of Mecca in the Hijaz region in 535 CE. He was the son of the Hashimite chief, Abd al-Muttalib, and a brother of Muhammad's father, Abdullah, who had died before Muhammad's birth. After the death of Muhammad's mother Aminah bint Wahab, Muhammad, a child still, was taken into the care of his grandfather, Abd al-Muttalib. When Muhammad reached eight years of age, Abd al-Muttalib died. One of Muhammad's uncles was to take him in. The oldest, Al-Harith was not wealthy enough to accept guardianship for his nephew. Abu Talib, despite his poverty, took in Muhammad in an act of selfless generosity. Another tradition states that while on his deathbed, Abdul Muttalib, the father of Abu Talib, chose the latter amongst his sons and entrusted him with the task of raising Muhammad.
Although Abu Talib was responsible for providing Siqaya and Rifada (Food and Beverages) of Hajj pilgrims, he lived in poverty. In order to fulfill his obligations towards the pilgrims, he had to borrow money from his brother Abbas, which he failed to return, thus being forced to letting Abbas take over the duty. Nevertheless, his social position did not take any harm from this failure.

Muhammad loved his uncle, and Abu Talib loved him in return. Abu Talib is remembered as a gifted poet, and many poetic verses in support of Muhammad are attributed to him. Once, as Abu Talib was about to leave for a trading expedition, Muhammad wept and could not bear being separated from him. To this Abu Talib responded, "By God I will take him with me, and we shall never part from each other."

Later in life, as an adult, Muhammad saw that Abu Talib was struggling financially after a severe drought. Muhammad decided to take charge of one of Abu Talib's children and he convinced Al-'Abbas to do the same. They discussed this matter with Abū Ṭālib, who asked that his favorite child 'Aqīl be left with him. Al-'Abbās chose Ja'far, and Muhammad chose 'Alī.

Protecting Muhammad
In tribal society, a tribal affiliation is important, otherwise a man can be killed with impunity. As leader of the Banu Hashim, Abu Talib acted as a protector to Muhammad. After Muhammad began preaching the message of Islam, members of the other Qurayshite clans increasingly came to feel threatened by Muḥammad. In attempts to quiet him, they pressured Abū Ṭālib to silence his nephew or control him. Despite these pressures, Abu Talib maintained his support of Muḥammad, defending him from the other leaders of the Quraysh. Leaders of the Quraysh directly confronted Abu Talib several times. Abu Talib brushed them off and continued to support Muhammad even when it put a rift between him and the Quraysh. In one account, the Quraysh even threatened to fight the Banu Hashim over this conflict. In a particular narration of one such confrontation, Abu Talib summoned Muhammad to speak with the Quraysh. Muhammad asked the Quraysh leaders to say the shahada and they were astounded.

The Quraysh even tried to bribe Abu Talib. They told Abu Talib that if he let them get hold of Muhammad, then he could adopt 'Umarah ibn al Walid ibn al Mughirah, the most handsome youth in Quraysh. When this also failed, the Quraysh elicited the support of other tribes to boycott trading with or marrying members of the Banu Hashim lineage. This boycott started seven years after Muhammad first received revelation and lasted for three years. The goal was to put pressure on the Hashimites and even starve them into submission. For the sake of security, many members of the Banu Hashim moved near to Abu Talib (Encyclopedia of Islam), and the place became like a ghetto. This didn't cause undue hardship because many had family members in other tribes that would smuggle goods to them. Abu Talib's brother, Abu Lahab, sided with the Quraysh on this issue; he moved to a house in the district of Abd Shams to demonstrate support for the Quraysh. He thought Muhammad was either mad or an impostor.

Protecting Muhammad put considerable pressure on Abu Talib and the Banu Hashim. In one instance Abu Talib exclaimed to Muhammad, "Save me and yourself, and do not put a greater burden on me than I cannot bear." Muhammad responded, "Oh uncle! By God Almighty I swear, even if they should put the sun in my right hand and the moon in my left that I abjure this cause, I shall not do so until God has vindicated it or caused me to perish in the process." Seeing his nephew's emotion, Abu Talib responded, "Go, nephew, and say what you like. By God, I will never hand you over for any reason."

Death
Abū Ṭālib died around 619 AD, at more than 80 years of age, about 10 years after the start of Muhammad's mission. This year is known as the Year of Sorrow for Muhammad, because not only did his uncle Abu Talib die, but also his wife Khadijah bint Khuwaylid, within a month of Abu Talib.

After Abu Talib's death, Muhammad was left unprotected. Abu Talib's brother and successor as the Chief of the family, that is Abu Lahab, did not protect him, as he was an enemy of Muhammad, so Muhammad and his followers faced incredible persecution. Muhammad is quoted as exclaiming, "By God, Quraysh never harmed me so much as after the death of Abu Talib." The early Muslims relocated to Abyssinia and then to Medina in order to escape persecution by the Quraysh.

Views
The memory of Abu Talib is influenced by political aims of the Sunni and Shia Muslims.

Sunni
It is reported in Sunni Islam that the Quranic verse 28:56 ("O Prophet! Verily, you guide not whom you like, but Allah guides whom He will") was revealed concerning Abu Talib's embrace Islam at the hands of his nephew.

." Along the same lines, there is a similar account where Ali informs Muhammad of Abu Talib's death by saying, "Your uncle, the erring old man, has died."

Shia
Shia believe that Abu Talib was an upright supporter of Muhammad. In addition, when Muhammad married Khadija, Abu Talib recited the sermon of the marriage. This fact has also been used to prove Abu Talib's monotheism. Abu Talib, according to the Shia, was a Muslim and died a Muslim.

Shia claim that the Sunni scholars in the recent centuries also support Shia arguments about Abu Talib.

Family

Abu Talib was married to Fatima bint Asad. They had four sons:
 Talib, He was his father's firstborn child, and Abu Talib received his kunya from him. Little is known about him; he had no children and his body was never discovered after around  624.
 'Aqīl ibn Abī Ṭālib (Abu Muslim), married Fatima bint Uqba and had many children: Abu Sa'id, Muslim, Musa, Abd Allah, Ramla, Ja'far, Muhammad and Abd al-Rahman.
 Ja'far ibn Abī Ṭālib (Abu Awn), married Asma bint Umays and had 3 sons: Abd Allah, Muhammad and Awn also had a daughter: Na'mi.
 'Alī ibn Abī Ṭālib (Abu Hasan), married a number of women, including Fatima bint Muhammad. He had many children like Hasan, Husayn, Abbas, Zaynab, Umm Kulthum and Muhammad.

and three daughters:
 Fākhita bint Abī Ṭālib (Umm Hani), married Hubayra ibn Abi Wahb and had four sons: Umar, Fulan, Yusuf, Amr and two daughters: Hani and Ja'dah
 Jumāna bint Abī Ṭālib (Umm Sufyan), married Abu Sufyan ibn al-Harith and had two sons, Sufyan and Ja'far, Ali
 Rayṭa bint Abī Ṭālib (Umm Talib), married Awn ibn Umays and had a son, Talib

Education of his children
 Muhammad and his wife, Khadija bint Khuwaylid, educated Ali
 Abbas ibn Abd al-Muttalib and his wife, Lubaba bint al-Harith, educated Talib
 Hamza ibn Abd al-Muttalib and his wife, Salma bint Umays, educated Ja'far
 Al-Zubayr ibn Abd al-Muttalib and his wife, Atika bint Abi Wahb, educated Aqil
 Abu Talib ibn Abd al-Muttalib and his wife, Fatima bint Asad, educated Fakhita, Jumana and Rayta

Family tree

 * indicates that the marriage order is disputed
 Note that direct lineage is marked in bold.

See also
 List of notable Hijazis
 Family tree of Ali
 Shi'a view of Ali
 Banu Hashim

References

619 deaths
Family of Muhammad
Year of birth unknown
People from Mecca
Banu Hashim
6th-century Arabs
7th-century Arabs
Burials at Jannat al-Mu'alla